Enypia is a genus of moths, commonly called girdle moths, in the family Geometridae.

Description
Ennypia moths have light brownish-gray wings with variably dense dark speckling and prominent, black antemedial and postmedial lines. The postmedial line is angled diagonally from the inner margin toward the apex and has a highly irregular toothed and scalloped outline, meeting the costa in the apical area. It is also irregular and fainter than on the forewing, with the outer margin being slightly angular. The antemedial line is scalloped or zigzagged hindwing and slightly paler.

Species
 Enypia coolidgi Cassino & Swett, 1923
 Enypia griseata Grossbeck, 1908 – mountain girdle
 Enypia packardata Taylor, 1906 – Packard's girdle
 Enypia venata (Grote, 1883) – variable girdle

References
 Enypia at Markku Savela's Lepidoptera and Some Other Life Forms
 Natural History Museum Lepidoptera genus database

Ourapterygini
Taxa named by George Duryea Hulst
Geometridae genera